Kiejstut Bereźnicki (born 21 December 1935 in Poznań) is a Polish painter, draftsman, and professor at the Academy of Fine Arts in Gdańsk.

References

External links
Works 1985-1995

20th-century Polish painters
20th-century Polish male artists
21st-century Polish painters
21st-century Polish male artists
1935 births
Living people
Artists from Poznań
People from Poznań Voivodeship (1921–1939)
Polish male painters
Academic staff of the Academy of Fine Arts in Gdańsk